Jerome V. Blatz (December 26, 1923 – August 20, 2009) was an American lawyer and politician.

Early life and education
Born in Bloomington, Minnesota, Blatz went to Nazareth Hall Prep School in Roseville, Minnesota. He received his bachelor's degree from the University of Notre Dame in 1946 and then received his law degree from Harvard Law School.

Career
He served in the United States Navy during the Korean War and was a pilot and weather expert. Blatz practiced law in Bloomington, Minnesota and taught law at the William Mitchell College of Law. He died in a hospital in Edina, Minnesota. He drafted Bloomington, Minnesota's first City Charter as an attorney, and represented Bloomington in the Minnesota Senate from 1963 to 1965 and from 1967 to 1977. Although elected on a non-partisan basis, he was a registered Republican.

References

1923 births
2009 deaths
People from Bloomington, Minnesota
University of Notre Dame alumni
Harvard Law School alumni
Military personnel from Minnesota
Minnesota lawyers
Republican Party Minnesota state senators
20th-century American politicians
20th-century American lawyers